The marginal nucleus of spinal cord, or posteromarginal nucleus, Rexed lamina I, is located at the most dorsal aspect of the dorsal horn of the spinal cord.  The neurons located here receive input primarily from Lissauer's tract and relay information related to pain and temperature sensation. Pain sensation relayed here cannot be modulated, e.g. pain from burning the skin.
The axons of neurons contribute to the lateral spinothalamic tract.

References 

Back anatomy
Spinal cord